Paweł Olszewski may refer to:
 Paweł Olszewski (politician)
 Paweł Olszewski (footballer)
 Pawel Olszewski (pentathlete)